Midden-Groningen (Gronings: Midden-Grunnen) is a municipality with a population of 60,953 in the province of Groningen, Netherlands. The municipality was formed by the merger of former municipalities of Hoogezand-Sappemeer, Slochteren and Menterwolde on 1 January 2018 in the context of the municipal redivision in the province of Groningen 2013-2018.

The municipality consists of the following villages and hamlets:
Borgercompagnie, Foxhol, Harkstede, Hellum, Hoogezand, Kolham, Kropswolde, Martenshoek, Meeden, Muntendam, Noordbroek, Sappemeer, Schildwolde, Siddeburen, Slochteren, Zuidbroek.

The neighbourhood of Meerstad, which belonged to the former municipality of Slochteren, was added to the municipality of Groningen on 1 January 2017 and therefore did not participate in the merger.

Naming 

On 15 March 2016, the new name for the merged municipality was announced in the village center of Zuidbroek. Midden-Groningen was opted out by the residents among two other nominees - Hogewolden and Woldmeren - with 48 percent of the votes. On 26 April 2016, the name was confirmed by the three municipal councils.

Gallery

References

External links 
 Official Website 

 
Municipalities of Groningen (province)
Municipalities of the Netherlands established in 2018